The inferior ligament of the epididymis is a strand of fibrous tissue which is covered by a reflection of the tunica vaginalis and connects the lower aspect of the epididymis with the testis. 

Sexual anatomy
Ligaments